The women's +87 kilograms competition at the 2022 World Weightlifting Championships was held on 15 December 2022.

Schedule

Medalists

Records

Results

References

Women's 87+ kg
World Championships